Apollo Hospitals Enterprise Limited is an Indian multinational healthcare group headquartered in Chennai. Along with the eponymous hospital chain, the company also operates pharmacies, primary care and diagnostic centres, telehealth clinics, and digital healthcare services among others through its subsidiaries.

The company was founded by Prathap C. Reddy in 1983 as the first corporate healthcare provider in India. Several of Apollo's hospitals have been among the first in India to receive international healthcare accreditation by the America-based Joint Commission International (JCI) as well as NABH accreditation.

History 
Apollo Hospitals was founded by Prathap C. Reddy in 1983 as the first corporate health care in India. The first branch at Chennai was inaugurated by the then President of India Zail Singh.

Apollo developed telemedicine services, after starting a pilot project in 2000 at Aragonda, Prathap Reddy's home village.

In 2007, Apollo Hospitals and DKV AG established a 74:26 joint venture health insurance company called Apollo DKV Insurance Co. The company was rebranded as Apollo Munich Health Insurance in 2009.

In October 2015, Apollo launched home care services under Apollo HomeCare and its digital healthcare platform called Ask Apollo.

Apollo signed an MoU with Health Education England in April 2017 to provide a large number of doctors to fill vacancies in the English National Health Service.

In January 2019, Apollo opened Apollo Proton Cancer Centre in Chennai, which is reportedly the first proton therapy facility across South Asia, Southeast Asia and the Middle East.

It also sold its joint venture hospital in Dhaka to Evercare.

In March 2022, Apollo Hospitals got included in Nifty 50 benchmark index, replacing Indian Oil, to become the first hospital company to be included on the index.

Subsidiaries

Apollo HealthCo
Apollo HealthCo was formed in 2021 with the merger of the group's non-hospital pharmacy chain Apollo Pharmacy and its digital healthcare business known as Apollo 24/7.
Apollo Pharmacy – Apollo Pharmacy is the largest retail pharmacy chain in India with more than 4000 outlets in over 21 states. It was started in 1987.
Apollo 24/7 – Apollo 24/7 is the digital healthcare platform of the group which was launched in 2020. It offers telehealth consultation, online medicine ordering and delivery, and in-home diagnostics among other services.

Apollo Health and Lifestyle
Apollo Health and Lifestyle is the primary care arm of the group which operates multi-specialty clinics under Apollo Clinics, diagnostics and pathology labs under Apollo Diagnostics, diabetes clinics under Apollo Sugar, dental hospitals under Apollo White, dialysis centres under Apollo Dialysis, surgical hospitals under Apollo Spectra, women/children hospitals under Apollo Cradle, and fertility clinics under Apollo Fertility.

Apollo Sugar Limited
The chain of clinics was founded in 2014 by Dr. Prathap C. Reddy, with a vision to create preventive healthcare and reduce the incidence of complications of diabetes.   Apollo Sugar Clinics collaborates with Sanofi India, a branch of the French multinational pharmaceutical company Sanofi which manufactures many prescription medications for both type 1 and type 2 diabetes. Apollo Sugar Clinics conducts diabetes screening camps in many locations of India. 

In January 2018, Apollo Sugar Clinics entered into a partnership with Israeli company GlucoMe, a maker of wireless blood glucose meters that can transfer blood glucose data to a medical care team. This is used for maintenance of electronic medical records (Electronic health record Wikipedia hyperlink) and to provide continuous assistance.

Apollo TeleHealth Services
Apollo TeleHealth Services owns the telehealth network of the group, operating via a business-to-consumer model under which it offers direct services like online consultations, appointment booking, medicine delivery, among others; a business-to-business offering to corporates for their employees; and a business-to-government agreement providing telehealth services in partnership with public health systems. Established in 1999, it is headquartered in Hyderabad and has more than 100 franchised teleclinics.

Research and education divisions

 Apollo Research and Innovations is a research arm of the group which is involved in clinical trials of drugs, medical devices, healthcare software and consumer products. It was established in 2000 and has 17 centres at hospital locations.
Apollo Hospitals Education & Research Foundation is a non-profit which conducts research projects at its wet lab run by the Cell and Molecular Biology Research Centre (CMBRC) in liquid biopsy, molecular diagnostics, pharmacogenomics and exosome technologies.
Apollo Medskills is a private-public partnership between Apollo Hospitals and National Skill Development Corporation started in 2012 for the development of medical skills of healthcare workforce through 40+ training institutes across the country.

See also
 Medical tourism in India
 Healthcare in Chennai

References

Further reading

External links 
 

 
Hospital networks in India
Companies based in Chennai
Hospitals in Chennai
Hospitals established in 1983
1983 establishments in Tamil Nadu
Health care companies of India
Indian companies established in 1983
Companies listed on the National Stock Exchange of India
Companies listed on the Bombay Stock Exchange
NIFTY 50